The Lifan 720 is a four-door mid-size sedan produced by the Lifan Motors division of Lifan Group.

Overview 

The Lifan 720 was launched in 2012 at the Guangzhou Auto Show with a price of 79,800 yuan.  

As of August 2013, a trim called the Comfort was launched with a lower price range from 66,800 yuan to 69,800 yuan.

Powertrain
The Lifan 720 is powered by a 4-cylinder 1.8-litre engine producing 128 hp and a torque of 168N·m. A version with a 4-cylinder 1.5-litre engine producing 109 hp and a torque of 146N·m was available from 2013. The engines are mated to a 5-speed manual transmission.

References

External links

Lifan Motors website

720
Lifan 720
Mid-size cars
Sedans
2010s cars
Cars of China